This is the List of municipalities in Niğde Province, Turkey .

Municipalities and mayors 
List is sorted alphabetically A-Z, as Districts->Municipalities.

References 

Geography of Niğde Province
Nigde